The Christian Wetzel Cabin, near Junction City, Kansas, also known as the Louis Kettlass Cabin, was built in 1857 by Isaac H. Loder for $225 for Louis Kettlass.  It was listed on the National Register of Historic Places in 1973.

It is a one-story log cabin with a loft.

The cabin was relocated in about 1955 by the Kansas District Lutheran-Laymen's League, which restored the structure and opened it as a Lutheran historical site and museum. The site was relocated again in 2004 to the west side of Junction City to the Spring Valley Historic Site.

References

Houses on the National Register of Historic Places in Kansas
Houses completed in 1857
National Register of Historic Places in Geary County, Kansas
Log cabins in the United States